Part-time can refer to:

 Part-time job, a job that has fewer hours a week than a full-time job
 Part-time student, a student, usually in higher education, who takes fewer course credits than a full-time student
 Part Time, an American pop band

See also 

 Full-time (disambiguation)